Personal Inspirations is an album by American R&B singer Stephanie Mills released in 1994 on the independent label GospoCentric Records, it is her first gospel album release. It was produced by Mills, and gospel artist Donald Lawrence. Featured, are songs written by gospel/R&B singers' Marvin Winans, Angela Winbush, James Cleveland, and a cover version of "People Get Ready" by Curtis Mayfield. The album peaked at No. 8 on the Billboard Gospel chart, and No. 20 on the Billboard Contemporary Christian chart.

Track listing
 "I Had a Talk with God"  (James Cleveland) - 6:25
 "Sweepin' Through the City"  (James Herndon) - 4:10
 "He Cares"  (John P. Kee) - 5:15
 "In the Morning Time" (Robert Wright) - 4:42
 "Everything You Touch"  (Marvin Winans) - 6:13
 "Everybody Ought to Know" - 6:02
 "Power of God"  (Angela Winbush) - 7:36
 "People Get Ready" (Curtis Mayfield) - 4:12
 "He Cares" [reprise]  - 3:25
 "I'm Gonna Make You Proud"  (Donald Lawrence) - 3:58

source

Personnel
Stephanie Mills - Lead and backing vocals
Backing vocals – Tricity Singers (tracks: 1, 5)
Bass – Mel Gray
Drums – James Robinson (tracks: 2), Jeremy Hays
Percussion – Jim Brock
Guitar – Eric Brice
Keyboards – Kevin Bond, Stanley Brown (tracks: 4, 8)
Mixed by Donald Lawrence, Mark Williams, Stephanie Mills
Engineer by Dave Harris, Donald Lawrence, Mark Williams (tracks: 2), Mike Lawler (tracks: 2)
Executive producer – Donald Lawrence, Stephanie Mills
Producer – Donald Lawrence, Kevin Bond (tracks: 5, 6), Stanley Brown (tracks: 4, 8), Stephanie Mills (tracks: 1, 2, 3, 7, 9, 10)

Charts

References

External links
Personal Inspirations - amazon.com

1994 albums
Stephanie Mills albums
GospoCentric Records albums
Urban contemporary gospel albums